Anton Cassar (1924 – 30 June 2014) was a Maltese journalist and editor, who founded L-Orizzont, a national daily newspaper, in 1962.
 Cassar also served as L-Orizzont's first editor.

Cassar was born in Marsa, Malta, in 1924. He started his career as a journalist at Il-Berqa in 1946. He was awarded the Gold Award from the Institute of Maltese Journalists (IMJ) for his work. He also received a lifetime achievement award from the National Book Council in 2013.

Anton Cassar died on 30 June 2014, at the age of 90.

References

1924 births
2014 deaths
Newspaper founders
Maltese journalists
Maltese newspaper editors
People from Marsa, Malta